Telopea can refer to:
Telopea (plant), a genus of shrubs, common name waratahs
Telopea (journal), a botanical journal named after the genus
Telopea, New South Wales, a suburb of Sydney, Australia
Telopea Park School